Golden Lake is a lake in Anoka County, Minnesota, in the United States.

Golden Lake was named for John Golden, the original owner of the land surrounding the lake.

See also
List of lakes in Minnesota

References

Lakes of Minnesota
Lakes of Anoka County, Minnesota